Dimitar Ivanov Popov (October 13, 1894 – October 25, 1975) was a Bulgarian organic chemist and an academician of the Bulgarian Academy of Sciences.

Prof. D. Ivanov is known by his father's name Ivanov rather than his family's name Popov.

He is the namesake of the Ivanov reaction in chemistry.

References

Members of the Bulgarian Academy of Sciences
Bulgarian chemists
Scientists from Sofia
Organic chemists
1894 births
1975 deaths
20th-century Bulgarian scientists